The 2012 Gloucester City Council local elections took place on 3 May 2012 to elect members of Gloucester City Council in Gloucester, England. This was on the same day as other United Kingdom local elections were taking place across the country. The Conservatives lost one seat to Labour, leaving the Conservatives with exactly half the seats on the council, putting it under no overall control. The Conservatives continued to run the council, with their leader Paul James remaining leader of the council after the election.

Results
The overall results were as follows:

|}

Turnout for the election was 32%, down 7% from the previous year.

Results by ward
The results, by ward (candidates with an asterisk* were the previous incumbent standing for re-election):

References

2012 English local elections
2012
Politics of Gloucester
2010s in Gloucestershire